Tadtad, officially Sagrado Corazon Señor (SCS), is a far-right Christian ethno-nationalist organization which also functioned as a paramilitary organization. It is also often characterized as a cult.

History
Tadtad (officially Sagrado Corazon Señor) was established in 1972 in Initao, Misamis Oriental by Sagrado Sade Jr.

Beliefs and rites
An applicant seeking to join Tadtad had to go under an initiation rite to be able to join the group. Their inner arm had to be struck with a sharp sword at least 12 times. If the individual don't exhibit any visible cut, the applicant is deemed fit to become a member; if the sword made a cut, it is considered as a sign that the applicant has a dark side and therefore unfit to join.

The group's members hold their founder Sagrado Sade Jr. with high reverence and calls him Papa Sagrado. Members pray to Sade similar in a way Roman Catholics ask for intercession through its saints. According to the Tadtad, when Sade was baptized as an infant the priest sensed "something holy" about the baby which led him being named "Sagrado" (Sade was supposedly to be named "Ramonito"). Sade grew up to becoming a faith healer and gained reputation in Mindanao after reportedly curing many before he founded the Tadtad.

Many members are also Roman Catholics themselves and go to mainstream churches and observe the relevant religious holidays despite their affiliation with Tadtad. Tadtad members hold do additional observances which set them apart from mainstream Roman Catholicism. They pray every three hours on their own and on Fridays, they congregate in their chapel to pray together. They consider acts such as smoking, drinking alcohol, gambling as sinful.

The Tadtad are also known for their usage of amulets along with their prayer and faith to protect themselves from bodily injury including those caused by bullets.

Armed activity
The Tadtad had fought against the New People's Army (NPA) as well as went after suspected members and sympathizers of the Communist rebel group. They also fought against Moro rebels in the 1970s.

The Philippine Army and Tadtad had an armed encounter in the Pangantucan, Bukidnon on August 11, 2000. The fighting ensued after Filipino soldiers tried to serve a warrant of arrest against Tadtad leader Alfredo Opciona for charges of attempted murder. The incident caused the death of sixteen Tadtad members, three members of the army auxiliary group and one civilian.

See also
Communist rebellion in the Philippines
Moro conflict
Ilaga
Agimat, a Filipino term on amulet

References

Anti-communist organizations in the Philippines
Catholicism and far-right politics
Far-right terrorism
Christian fascists
1972 establishments in the Philippines
Christian organizations based in the Philippines
Cults
Paramilitary organizations based in the Philippines
Christian new religious movements
Organizations established in 1972